Nguyễn Thế Anh (born 21 September 1981) is a Vietnamese former footballer who played as a goalkeeper. He is currently goalkeeper coach of V.League 1 club Hanoi FC.

References

1981 births
Living people
Vietnamese footballers
Vietnam international footballers
Song Lam Nghe An FC players
Becamex Binh Duong FC players
V.League 1 players
People from Nghệ An province
Association football goalkeepers
Footballers at the 2002 Asian Games
Navibank Sài Gòn FC players
Asian Games competitors for Vietnam